Moala Airport  is an airport serving Moala, the main island of the Moala Islands, a subgroup of the Lau Islands in Fiji. It is operated by Airports Fiji Limited.

Facilities

Airlines and destinations

References

External links
 

Airports in Fiji
Lau Islands